Jon Ballantyne (born in Prince Albert, Saskatchewan, Canada) is a pianist and composer who resides in the New York area.

Career
Ballantyne started playing piano at an early age and began formal study at the age of six. His father Fred is a pianist and both parents are jazz enthusiasts and exposed him to the recordings of  Miles Davis, Thelonious Monk, Bill Evans and Duke Ellington. His mother took him to an Oscar Peterson concert when he was six-years-old.

He studied classical piano and played in a garage-band when he was a teenager. He attended North Texas State University, where he played with visiting musicians such as Nat Adderley, Michael Brecker, Ron Carter, Peter Erskine, Joe Henderson, Elvin Jones, Dianne Reeves. Bob Mintzer, and Emily Remler. At the Banff Centre in Alberta, Canada, he worked played with John Abercrombie, Karl Berger, Ed Blackwell, Steve Coleman, Dave Holland, Lee Konitz, Dave Liebman, Eddie Marshall, Julian Priester, Cecil Taylor, Don Thompson, and Kenny Wheeler. In New York City, he studied with Kenny Barron, Richie Beirach, Joanne Brackeen, Hal Galper, and Barry Harris.

He has performed with or recorded with Pepper Adams, Krister Andersson, Reid Anderson, Peter Bernstein, Ed Bickert, Paul Bley, Don Braden, Terry Clarke, Avishai Cohen, Al Cohn, Scott Colley, Buddy DeFranco, Ray Drummond, Phil Dwyer, Charles Fambrough, Jerry Fuller, George Garzone, Mick Goodrick, Jimmy Giuffre, Nicole Glover, Bill Goodwin, Drew Gress, Al Grey, Craig Handy, Billy Hart, Roy Haynes, Joe Henderson, Vincent Herring, Ingrid Jensen, Roxy Koss, Joe LaBarbera, Chris Lewis,  Joe Lovano, Mingus Big Band, Red Mitchell, Adam Nussbaum, Gene Perla, Ben Perowsky, P. J. Perry, Rich Perry, Dewey Redman, John Riley, Shorty Rogers, Jim Rotondi, Richard Stoltzman, Ben Street, Neil Swainson, Lew Tabackin, Clark Terry, Ben Turner, and Phil Woods, to name a few.

As a six-year resident of Park Slope, Brooklyn in the 1990s, he played afternoon jam sessions in his studio apartment with young musicians, most of them neighbors, such as Seamus Blake, Bill Carrothers, Phil Haynes, Donny McCaslin, Dave Pietro, Jay Rosen, Tony Scherr, Mark Turner, and Matt Wilson.

He has conducted educational clinics at the Sibelius Academy in Helsinki and at  the University of Colorado Boulder, University of Northern Colorado in Greeley, McGill University, University of Toronto, and Concordia University.

He led a quartet with bassist Boris Kozlov, drummer Jeff Hirshfield, and saxophonist/bass clarinetist Douglas Yates, and currently plays in the Trios of Bill Goodwin, and Gene Perla (The Parker Trio).

Awards and honors
He received Juno Awards for the albums Sky Dance and Avenue Standard.

He and fellow Canadian musician Hugh Sicotte released an experimental album (delving into Hugh's real-time laptop-programs manipulations of Jon's playing of acoustic, electric and prepared piano) called Twenty Accident Free Workdays, which was nominated for a Juno Award.

Discography
An asterisk (*) indicates that the year is that of release.

Filmography
 In the Key of Eh! Canadian Jazz Piano (1996)
 DUOS: The Jazz Sessions (1999)
 SOLOS: The Jazz Sessions (Bravo! Canada, 2006)

References

External links
 JonBallantyne.com
 Official Myspace Page

1963 births
Living people
Place of birth missing (living people)
Musicians from Saskatchewan
Canadian jazz pianists
Juno Award for Best Jazz Album winners
Juno Award for Traditional Jazz Album of the Year winners
21st-century Canadian pianists
Justin Time Records artists